"Going Back to Cali" is a song recorded by American rapper the Notorious B.I.G. and Diddy (uncredited) from the album Life After Death. The song is noted as one of Biggie's popular songs from the album, well known for its catchy hook and beat. The song contains a sample of Zapp hit "More Bounce to the Ounce".

Background
The song is about Biggie returning to Los Angeles and the West Coast. It begins with a telephone conversion between Diddy and Biggie, in which Diddy tells Biggie that he needs to get ready for a flight from New York (JFK) to Los Angeles (LAX). Biggie sounds as if he's just been woken up by Diddy's telephone call. The second verse begins with Biggie's thoughts on the East Coast–West Coast hip hop rivalry and his relationship to the West Coast:

If I got to choose a coast, I got to choose the EastI live out there, so don't go thereBut that don't mean a nigga can't rest in the WestSee some nice breasts in the WestSmoke some nice sess in the WestY'all niggas is a messThinkin' I'm gon' stop givin' L.A. propsAll I got is beef with those that violate meI shall annihilate thee

Cover versions
Harlem rapper Mase (who was associated with Biggie) recorded a cover version of the song titled "Going Back To Harlem".

The song is heavily sampled in E-40's song "Bust Moves" from his 2012 album, The Block Brochure: Welcome to the Soil 1. The song features E-40's labelmates Big Omeezy and Droop-E, the latter of whom is E-40's son.

The song is sampled on the beginning of "When We Party", which is by Faith Evans and uses vocals from Biggie and features Snoop Dogg. The song is on his and Faith Evans' 2017 album The King & I.

Charts

Weekly charts

References

1998 singles
Bad Boy Records singles
The Notorious B.I.G. songs
Song recordings produced by Easy Mo Bee
Songs released posthumously
G-funk songs
Songs written by the Notorious B.I.G.
Songs written by Easy Mo Bee
Songs written by Roger Troutman